Abraham Torres (born January 16, 1968 in Turmero, Aragua) is a former Venezuelan boxer, who was nicknamed "Habran". At the 1988 Summer Olympics, he lost in the third round of the men's bantamweight division (52–54 kg) to Thailand's eventual bronze medalist, Phajol Moolsan.

External links
Profile

1968 births
Living people
People from Turmero
Bantamweight boxers
Olympic boxers of Venezuela
Boxers at the 1988 Summer Olympics
Venezuelan male boxers